Mammillaria baumii is a species of cactus in the subfamily Cactoideae. It is endemic to Mexico. It was named for botanist Hugo Baum.

References

Plants described in 1926
baumii
Endemic flora of Mexico